Schefflera palawanensis is a species of plant in the family Araliaceae. It is endemic to the Philippines.  It is threatened by habitat loss.

References

Endemic flora of the Philippines
Flora of Palawan
palawanensis
Endangered plants
Taxonomy articles created by Polbot
Taxa named by Elmer Drew Merrill